Oplopanax japonicus is deciduous shrub that can grow as high as  tall. The plant is densely packed with spikes and those spikes are irritant. This species of plant belongs to a genus that is rich in calcium oxalate, which is toxic to the digestive system.

Distribution
Oplopanax japonicus is naturally found in East Asia, specifically in Japan. It is usually found in the coniferous shady forest of Northern Japan.  One species is also found in China and North America.

Habitat and ecology
Oplopanax japonicus grow in woodland garden and dappled shade, shady edge and not in deep shade. The optimal cultivation environment is a moist, well drained and retentive soil.

Morphology
Oplopanax japonicus is a hardy frost resistant shrub. It is also the most spiny member of the ginseng family. The stem is prickly and stocky. Petiole , densely covered with setae. The shape of the lobe is triangular or broadly triangular, base cordate, margin irregularly serrate, apex acute to slightly acuminate. They have ornamental qualities but are armed with spikes. The plant also features spiny leaves and stems.

Flowers and fruit

Flowers of Oplopanax japonicus, is usually hermaphrodite (having both male and female organs). Calyx 5-toothed and glabrous. Styles united to middle, slender and apical. Fruit yellow-red at maturity, and sometimes globose.

Food
The leaves and roots of Oplopanax japonicas can be used as food. Young shoots have to be thoroughly peeled and cooked for eating. Roots can be cooked or chewed.

Herbal medicine

Oplopanax japonicus is used in herbal medicine.  A sesquiterpene has been isolated and a synthetic derivative of the ketone form has been commercially produced in Japan to treat cough.

Chemical constituents

An example of a sesquiterpene that has been isolated and characterized is oplapanone.

References

External links
 
 

Araliaceae
Flora of Japan